Josef Huml (born 15 June 1880, date of death unknown) was a Czechoslovak wrestler. He competed in the Greco-Roman middleweight event at the 1920 Summer Olympics.

References

External links
 

1880 births
Year of death missing
Olympic wrestlers of Czechoslovakia
Wrestlers at the 1920 Summer Olympics
Czechoslovak male sport wrestlers
Place of birth missing